2022 Donetsk attack may refer to:

 March 2022 Donetsk attack
 Maisky Market attack
 September 2022 Donetsk attack